Manassé Ruben Enza-Yamissi (born  28 September 1989) is a Central African professional footballer who plays as a centre back.

Career
Enza-Yamissi was born in Bangui. He played on the professional level in Ligue 2 for Nîmes Olympique and in the Championnat de France amateur for the reserve team of FC Sochaux-Montbéliard.

In 2010, he joined SC Amiens with whom he gained promotion to the Ligue 2. After the team was relegated to the Championnat National, Enza-Yamissi left.

In the summer of 2012 Enza-Yamissi joined Liga I club Petrolul Ploiești. He signed a two year contract with the Romanian side.

After his contract with Petrolul ended in the summer of 2014, he signed with Portuguese side Gil Vicente.

After suffering relegation to Segunda Liga with Gil Vicente in the 2014–15 season, Enza-Yamissi left the club and signed a two-year deal with US Orléans.

Personal life
Manassé is the brother of Central African Republic national team player Eloge Enza Yamissi.

Honours
Petrolul Ploieşti
Romanian Cup: 2012–13

References

External links
 
 
 
 
 

Living people
1989 births
People from Bangui
Association football defenders
Central African Republic footballers
Central African Republic international footballers
Ligue 2 players
Championnat National players
Championnat National 2 players
Championnat National 3 players
Liga I players
Primeira Liga players
AJ Auxerre players
FC Sochaux-Montbéliard players
Nîmes Olympique players
FC Petrolul Ploiești players
CS Concordia Chiajna players
Gil Vicente F.C. players
FC Annecy players
Central African Republic expatriate footballers
Expatriate footballers in France
Expatriate footballers in Romania
Expatriate footballers in Portugal
Central African Republic expatriate sportspeople in France
Central African Republic expatriate sportspeople in Romania
Central African Republic expatriate sportspeople in Portugal